The Newport Colts were a minor league baseball team based in Newport, Rhode Island from 1897 and to 1899. The Newport Colts teams played as members of the New England League, winning the league championship in 1897 and a spilt–season pennant in 1899. The Newport Ponies succeeded the Colts in minor league play, becoming members of the short–lived 1908 Atlantic Association.

Newport teams reportedly played home minor league games at Cardines Field, built in 1893 and still in use today.

History
In 1897, the Newport Colts began minor league play. Newport became members of the six–team Class B level New England League. The Brockton Shoemakers, Fall River Indians, New Bedford Whalers, Pawtucket Phenoms and Taunton Herrings joined Newport in 1897 New England League league play.

After beginning play on May 1, 1897, the Newport Colts won the New England League championship in their first season of play. The Colts had a record of 70–37 record, playing under manager Mickey Finn and finished in a tie, as the Brockton Shoemakers finished with the same record. They were followed by the Pawtucket Phenoms (54–51), Fall River Indians (47–59), Taunton Herrings (40–68) and New Bedford Whalers (38–67) in the New England League final standings. Pitcher Marvin Hawley of Newport led the league with 24 wins.

Continuing play in the 1898 six–team Class B level New England League, the Newport Colts placed 4th in the final standings, as the league folded during the season. The league stopped play on July 5, 1898. The Colts ended the season with a record of 26–28, playing under returning manager Mickey Finn and Mike Kelley. Newport finished 9.0 games behind the 1st place Brockton Shoemakers in the final standings. Player/manager Mike Kelley led the league with 56 runs scored and teammate John Gilbert stole 36 bases to lead the league.

The 1899 New England League expanded to eight teams, but four folded during the season. With a 52–46 final record, the Newport Colts placed 3rd among the four remaining teams in the overall standings. Playing again under manager Mickey Finn, the Colts finished 8.0 games behind the 1st place Portland Phenoms. The New England League did not return to play in the 1900 season. John Gilbert again led the league with 53 stolen bases and Newport pitcher Gussie Gannon led the league with a .739 win percentage, compiling a record of 17–6.

It was reported that the Newport Colts won the second–half of the 1899 New England League season under dubious circumstances. Allegedly, the Portland Phenoms and Manchester Manchester, not wanting Newport to win the second half of the season, expanded the schedule on the final day from a doubleheader to play six games in one day, beginning at 9:00 AM. Manchester won all six games, to move ahead of Newport in the standings, but the league allowed only two of the wins. In was noted that Portland subsequently refused to play Newport in the finals.

Newport was without a minor league team until 1908, when the city hosted their final minor league team to date. The  Newport Ponies played briefly as members of the Atlantic Association. After beginning league play on May 2, 1908, the Ponies had a record of 5–5 record under managers Ben Anthony and George Reed. The Atlantic Association disbanded on May 21, 1908, with Newport in 4th place, 2.5 games behind the 1st place Portland Blue Sox.

Newport, Rhode Island has not hosted another minor league team.

The ballpark
Newport minor league teams reportedly hosted home games at Cardines Field. Originally called "Basin Field" and built in 1893 on railroad land, with the backstop added in 1908. The ballpark is still in use today. The Newport Gulls of the New England Collegiate Baseball League continue play at Cardines Field. The location is America's Cup Avenue and West Marlborough Street, Newport, Rhode Island.

Timeline

Year-by-year record

Notable alumni

Joe Bean (1897–1898)
Kitty Bransfield (1898)
Frank Corridon (1899)
Pat Crisham (1897)
Joe Delahanty (1897)
Ben Ellis (1897)
Tom Fleming (1899)
William Gallagher (1898)
Gussie Gannon (1898–1899)
Jack Gilbert (1897–1899)
Marvin Hawley (1897)
Mike Hickey (1898)
Mike Kelley (1897), (1898, MGR)
Jim McCormick (1898–1899)
Frank Morrissey (1899)
Dave Pickett (1897–1898)
Danny Shay (1899)
Tom Smith (1899)
Dummy Stephenson (1897)

See also
Newport Colts players

References

External links
Baseball Reference

Defunct minor league baseball teams
Defunct baseball teams in Rhode Island
Baseball teams established in 1897
New England League teams
Baseball teams disestablished in 1899
Newport, Rhode Island